Laja River (Río De La Laja in Spanish) may refer to:

 Laja River (Mexico), Guanajuato, central Mexico
 Laja River (Chile)

See also 
 Lajas River
 Laja (disambiguation)